Edward Allen Amelung (born April 13, 1959) is an American former professional baseball outfielder. He is an alumnus of San Diego State University.

Signed by the Los Angeles Dodgers of the Major League Baseball (MLB) as an amateur free agent in 1980, Amelung made his MLB debut on July 28, 1984, and appeared in his final game on July 7, 1986.

External links

1959 births
Living people
Albuquerque Dukes players
American expatriate baseball players in Canada
Baseball players from California
Edmonton Trappers players
Los Angeles Dodgers players
Major League Baseball outfielders
Vero Beach Dodgers players
San Antonio Dodgers players
San Antonio Missions players
San Diego State Aztecs baseball players
Sportspeople from Fullerton, California
Alaska Goldpanners of Fairbanks players